Vails Corners is an unincorporated community in Morrow County, in the U.S. state of Ohio.

History
A variant name is Vails Cross Roads. Vails Cross Roads had a tavern dating back to the 1830s. A post office called Vail's Cross Roads was established in 1850, and remained in operation until 1873. The community was named for the local Vail family.

References

Unincorporated communities in Morrow County, Ohio
Unincorporated communities in Ohio